Daughter 2 (Sia dai 2, lit: "pity 2") is a 1996 Thai drama film directed by Chatrichalerm Yukol. The film was selected as the Thai entry for the Best Foreign Language Film at the 70th Academy Awards, but was not accepted as a nominee.

This film is a sequel to Daughter that was released a year earlier. The film series Daughter has a theme about the issues of teenagers in Thai society.

Daughter 2 contains a story about a Thai-Westerner high school student, a teenage girl who accidentally gets infected with HIV. It is the first performance of Marisa Anita, a Thai-Dutch actress. 

The film has Arunroj Liamthong a real reporter playing the role of Pasinee Srikamroong a female reporter who reports on the issue leading to social awareness.

Cast
 Sorapong Chatree as Rabin (Rose's Father)
 Arunroj Liamthong as Pasinee Srikamroong
 Marisa Anita as Rose
 Wichuda Monkolket as Sida
 Yanee Tramoth as Anuwat (as Yani Tramod)
 Sarin Bangyeekan as Sarit
 Fonpa Sadissarat as May

See also
 List of submissions to the 70th Academy Awards for Best Foreign Language Film
 List of Thai submissions for the Academy Award for Best Foreign Language Film

References

External links
 

1996 films
1996 drama films
Thai drama films
Thai-language films
Films directed by Chatrichalerm Yukol